The Sigma APO 150-500mm F5-6.3 DG OS HSM lens is a super-telephoto lens produced by Sigma Corporation. It contains three SLD (Special Low Dispersion) glass elements to provide correction for chromatic aberration. It is aimed toward advanced consumer level photographers, and is available in Nikon, Canon, Pentax and Sigma camera mounts.

Technical information
The optical construction consists of 21 lens elements divided into 15 groups. The 9-bladed diaphragm begins at f/5 when shooting wide open, progressing towards f/6.3 at 500mm. As expected with similar long telephoto zoom lenses, optical quality drops off at the extremes of the telephoto range.

Autofocus is achieved using a moderately fast hypersonic motor for quiet operation. Additionally, all focus elements are internal so in operation the front element does not rotate or extend during focusing, which is useful when a polarizing filter is employed.

Recall
In 2010, Sigma recalled some lenses due to a "potential autofocus defect". Sigma offered customers a modification service, free of charge. Lenses requiring the modification were those with serial numbers between 10674301 and 10972000. Sigma lenses APO 50-500mm F4.5-6.3 DG OS HSM and APO 120-400mm F4.5-5.6 DG OS HSM were also affected.

See also
List of Nikon compatible lenses with integrated autofocus-motor

References

External links
 Sigma Press Release, 2008

150-500
A-mount lenses
EF-mount lenses
F-mount lenses
K-mount lenses